Dried Blood is an EP recorded by the German industrial act Wumpscut.

Summary

Dried Blood is the fourth release by Wumpscut, his first EP, and his first release on Ant-Zen Records.

It was first distributed in Europe by Discordia, two times in 1994 and 1995 with alternate artwork.  It was again distributed by Ant-Zen alone twice in 1995 and lastly remastered and distributed by Nova-Tekk in 1997.  Each one of these releases has slightly different artwork.

Dried Blood was later combined with Gomorra to form the CD Dried Blood of Gomorrha.

Track listing

Dried Blood (all Ant-Zen versions))

 "Black Death (French Concept)"  – 5:53
 "Dying Culture (First Movement)"  – 3:41
 "Body Parts (Radio Edit)"  – 4:36
 "Funeral Diner (Red Tape Version)"  – 4:08
 "Dried Blood (Radical Cut)"  – 1:46

Dried Blood (Nova Tekk, 1997)

 "Black Death (French Concept)"  – 5:53
 "Body Parts (Radio Edit)"  – 4:36
 "Funeral Diner (Red Tape Version)"  – 4:08
 "Dried Blood (Radical Cut)"  – 1:46
 "Dying Culture (First Movement)"  – 3:41

External links
 Official homepage
 Fan page with detailed information

Wumpscut albums
1994 EPs